Bajra may refer to:

 Bajra (Ludhiana East), Punjab, India
 Bajra, Pakistan, in Punjab province
 The name in Indian languages for pearl millet